Rapana is a genus of large predatory sea snails, marine gastropod mollusks in the family Muricidae, the rock snails.

Description 
The shell of Rapana has a large body whorl, a correspondingly large aperture and a low spire. The surface is covered in a thin calcitic layer. The rachidian teeth have three large cusps but no marginal cusps, instead the outer sides of the lateral cusps on the rachidian have a comb-like region.

Species
Species within the genus Rapana include:
 Rapana bezoar  (Linnaeus, 1767)
 Rapana rapiformis  (Born, 1778)
 Rapana venosa  (Valenciennes, 1846)
Synonyms
 Rapana bella G. Nevill & H. Nevill, 1869: synonym of Rapa rapa (Linnaeus, 1758)
 Rapana bulbosa (Dillwyn, 1817): synonym of Rapana rapiformis (Born, 1778)
 Rapana clathrata A. Adams, 1854: synonym of Coralliophila clathrata (A. Adams, 1854) (original combination)
 Rapana coralliophila A. Adams, 1854: synonym of Coralliophila erosa (Röding, 1798) (junior synonym)
 Rapana foliacea Schumacher, 1817: synonym of Rapana bezoar (Linnaeus, 1767)
 Rapana fragilis A. Adams, 1854: synonym of Coralliophila erosa (Röding, 1798)
 Rapana fritschi E. von Martens, 1874: synonym of Coralliophila fritschi (E. von Martens, 1874) (original combination)
 Rapana fusiformis Martens, 1902: synonym of Mipus fusiformis (Martens, 1902) (original combination)
 † Rapana imperialis Hertlein & E. K. Jordan, 1927: synonym of † Califrapana vaquerosensis (Arnold, 1907)
 Rapana japonica Dunker, 1882: synonym of Babelomurex japonicus (Dunker, 1882) (original combination)
 Rapana lischkeana Dunker, 1882: synonym of Babelomurex lischkeanus (Dunker, 1882) (original combination)
 Rapana mira Cotton & Godfrey, 1932: synonym of Coralliophila mira (Cotton & Godfrey, 1932) (original combination)
 † Rapana neozelanica: synonym of † Fascioplex liraecostata (Suter, 1917) (original combination)
 Rapana nodosa A. Adams, 1854: synonym of Coralliophila nodosa (A. Adams, 1854) (original combination)
 Rapana pechiliensis Grabau & S. G. King, 1928: synonym of Rapana venosa (Valenciennes, 1846)
 Rapana pellucida  Bozzetti, 2008: synonym of Rapa rapa (Linnaeus, 1758)
 Rapana pontica F. Nordsieck, 1968: synonym of Rapana venosa (Valenciennes, 1846) 
 Rapana pulchella A. Adams, 1854: synonym of Coralliophila pulchella (A. Adams, 1854) (original combination)
 Rapana rhodostoma A. Adams, 1855: synonym of Latirus rhodostoma (A. Adams, 1855) (original combination)
 † Rapana serrai Wiedey, 1928: synonym of †Califrapana vaquerosensis (Arnold, 1907)
 Rapana suturalis (A. Adams in H. Adams & A. Adams, 1853): synonym of Coralliophila erosa (Röding, 1798)
 Rapana thomasiana Crosse, 1861: synonym of Rapana venosa (Valenciennes, 1846) (synonym)
 † Rapana waihaoensis Suter, 1917 : synonym of † Fascioplex neozelanica (Suter, 1917)

References

External links

www.gastropods.com

 
Rapaninae
Gastropod genera